Ministry of Law and Gender was established by President Abdulla Yameen on July 1, 2014. 
Government agencies:
Attorney General
Home for people with Special Needs
Kuda Kudhinge Hiyaa
Amaan Hiyaa
Educational Training Centre for Children
Family and Children's Services Centres

Went under the newly formed Ministry of Law and Gender.Attorney General Mohamed Anil took over as the new minister of Law and Gender.

References

External links
 agoffice.gov.mv
 agoffice.gov.mv
Report Child sex offences
Report Any illegal activitys
Presidents Office

Government of the Maldives